Edward Durr Jr. (born July 18, 1963) is an American politician and truck driver who has served in the New Jersey Senate since 2022, representing the 3rd Legislative district. A member of the Republican Party, Durr won his first election in 2021 against incumbent Democratic State Senate President Stephen Sweeney in what was considered a major upset.

Early life 
Durr was born July 18, 1963, and was raised in Gloucester City, New Jersey, where he attended Gloucester City Junior-Senior High School.

Political career

2021 State Senate election 

Before running for State Senate in 2021, Durr ran unsuccessfully for a seat in the New Jersey General Assembly in 2017 and 2019.

Durr ran for New Jersey State Senate as a Republican in 2021. He challenged incumbent Democratic Senate President Stephen Sweeney in New Jersey's 3rd Legislative District. At the time, Sweeney was the longest-serving Senate president in the history of New Jersey. Durr stated that being denied a concealed carry permit despite having a clean record motivated him to run for State Senate. While it was reported that Durr spent only $153 on his campaign, that was the amount he spent in the unopposed Republican primary, not the general election. Over the course of his general campaign, Durr spent approximately $2,300, while Sweeney spent approximately $305,000. Durr's campaign video was taken using a cellular phone.

In a massive political upset, Durr defeated Sweeney on Election Day by a margin of 51.7%-48.3%. Durr's defeat of Sweeney made headlines in The New York Times, The Washington Post, and USA Today. On Election Day, Durr commented, "It didn't happen because of me. I'm nobody. I'm absolutely nobody. I'm just a simple guy. It was the people. It was a repudiation of the policies that have been forced down their throats". He also mentioned how he often joked that he was going to "shock the world" by winning the election, but later stated that he never truly thought it would happen. Durr was likely helped by the performance of Republican gubernatorial nominee Jack Ciattarelli, who carried the district by over 15 points.

Controversial statements 
Following his victory, past social media posts made by Durr created controversy. The posts related to topics such as vaccine mandates, the January 6 Capitol attack, Vice President Kamala Harris, and Islam. He apologized for the comments, stating, "I'm a passionate guy and I sometimes say things in the heat of the moment. If I said things in the past that hurt anybody's feelings, I sincerely apologize".

In 2019, Durr tweeted that "Islam is a false religion" and added that "Mohammed was a pedophile!" Muslim advocacy groups called on him to repudiate the tweet. Durr later met with local Muslim leaders and declared his opposition to "Islamophobia and all forms of hate."

Political positions 
Durr has advocated for cutting income taxes, corporate taxes, and other state taxes, as well as reducing property taxes. He describes himself as a "constitutional conservative". Durr is a strong supporter of the Second Amendment. He has said that "abortion is wrong and should be stopped" and is a supporter of the six-week abortion ban.

In 2022, Durr introduced a "Don't Say Gay" bill to the state Senate, which had no Senate cosponsors.

Personal life 
Durr has three children and six grandchildren. He lives in the Repaupo section of Logan Township.

References

External links
Senator Durr's legislative webpage, New Jersey Legislature

1960s births
21st-century American politicians
American truck drivers
Conservatism in the United States
Living people
Republican Party New Jersey state senators
People from Gloucester City, New Jersey
People from Gloucester County, New Jersey
Politicians from Camden County, New Jersey